Douglas Day Stewart is an American screenwriter and film director. He graduated from Claremont McKenna College in 1962.

Filmography

Writer
Room 222 (episodes: "KWWH", "Stay Awhile, Mr. Dream Chaser", "The Quitter" and "You Don't Know Me, He Said") (1971-1972 (TV)
Bonanza (episode: "The Initiation") (1972) (TV)
Cannon (episodes: "The Rip-Off" and "Catch Me If You Can") (1972-1973) (TV)
The Man Who Could Talk to Kids (1973) (TV)
Murder or Mercy (1974) (TV)
Gone with the West (1975)
The Last Survivors (1975) (TV)
The Boy in the Plastic Bubble (1976) (TV)
The Other Side of the Mountain Part 2 (1978)
The Blue Lagoon (1980)
An Officer and a Gentleman (1982) (also producer)
Thief of Hearts (1984)
Listen to Me (1989)
The Scarlet Letter (1995)
Silver Strand (1995)
What About Love (2020)

Director
Listen to Me (1989)
Thief of Hearts (1984)

References

External links

Year of birth missing (living people)
Living people
American male screenwriters
American film directors
Claremont McKenna College alumni
American television writers
American male television writers
Film producers from California
Screenwriters from California